Get Out is a 2017 American psychological horror film written, co-produced, and directed by Jordan Peele in his directorial debut. It stars Daniel Kaluuya, Allison Williams, Lil Rel Howery, LaKeith Stanfield, Bradley Whitford, Caleb Landry Jones, Stephen Root, and Catherine Keener. The plot follows a young black man (Kaluuya), who uncovers shocking secrets when he meets the family of his white girlfriend (Williams).

Principal photography began in February 2016 in Fairhope, Alabama, then moved to Barton Academy and the Ashland Place Historic District in Mobile, Alabama. The entire film was shot in 23 days.

Get Out premiered at the Sundance Film Festival on January 23, 2017, and was theatrically released in the United States on February 24, 2017, by Universal Pictures. The film received critical acclaim for its screenplay, direction, acting, and social critiques. It was a major commercial success, grossing $255 million worldwide on a $4.5 million budget, with a net profit of $124.3 million, making it the tenth-most profitable film of 2017.

It was chosen by the National Board of Review, the American Film Institute, and Time as one of the top ten films of the year. Peele won the Academy Award for Best Original Screenplay at the 90th Academy Awards, with additional nominations for Best Picture, Best Director and Best Actor (Kaluuya). It also earned five nominations at the 23rd Critics' Choice Awards: two at the 75th Golden Globe Awards and two at the 71st British Academy Film Awards.

Get Out has maintained a strong reputation since its release, and it is commonly cited by critics as one of the best films of the 21st century, featuring in multiple listings of the best films of the 2010s.

Plot 
Chris Washington is a black photographer from Brooklyn, New York, preparing for a weekend visit to Upstate New York, to meet the family of his
white girlfriend, Rose Armitage. Hesitant, he asks Rose if her family knows about their interracial relationship, but she assures him that they are not racist. While there, Rose's brother Jeremy and their parents, neurosurgeon Dean and hypnotherapist Missy, make disconcerting comments about black people, and Chris witnesses strange behavior from the estate's black housekeeper Georgina and groundskeeper Walter.

One night, Missy pressures Chris into a hypnotherapy session to cure his smoking addiction. While in a trance, he confesses that his mother was killed in a hit-and-run when he was a child and that he feels responsible for her death as he waited too long to call for help. He then enters a void Missy calls the "Sunken Place". The next morning, he assumes that the encounter was a dream until Walter acknowledges their brief session the night before. However, he is pleased to discover that the hypnosis was a success, as he no longer feels a desire to smoke.

Dozens of wealthy white people arrive for the Armitages' annual get-together, and express admiration for Chris' physique and for black figures such as Tiger Woods. Jim Hudson, an art dealer who has gone blind in his old age, takes a particular interest in Chris' photography skills. Chris meets another black man, Logan King, who behaves strangely and is married to a much older white woman. Chris relays the information to his friend, TSA officer Rod Williams. Chris tries to photograph Logan inconspicuously, but when his flash goes off, Logan becomes hysterical, shouting at Chris to "get out". The others restrain him, and Dean later claims that Logan had an epileptic seizure.

Away from the party, Chris tells Rose that they should leave. Meanwhile, the party guests hold a silent auction, disguised as a game of bingo, with Chris as the "prize", with Jim making the winning bid. Rod recognizes "Logan" as Andre Hayworth, a missing man from Brooklyn. Suspecting a conspiracy, Rod tries to tell the police, but his claims are dismissed. While Chris packs to leave, he finds photos of Rose in prior relationships with several black partners, including Walter and Georgina, contradicting her earlier claim that Chris is the first black person she has dated. He tries to leave the house, but Rose and her family lock him in. Chris attacks Jeremy, but Missy uses a "trigger" that she implanted during his hypnosis, knocking him out.

Chris awakens strapped to a chair in the basement. In a video presentation, Rose's grandfather Roman explains that the family transplants people's brains into others' bodies, granting them preferred physical characteristics and a twisted form of immortality. The host's consciousness remains in the Sunken Place, alive but powerless. The video then connects to a feed of Jim, speaking with Chris through an intercom. Jim says that although the Armitages target mainly black people, he doesn't care about Chris' race: he only wants his eyesight. Missy performs hypnosis, seemingly knocking Chris out.

When Jeremy comes to fetch Chris for the surgery, it is revealed that Chris blocked the hypnosis trigger by plugging his ears with cotton stuffing pulled from the chair. Chris bludgeons Jeremy unconscious with a bocce ball and heads to the operating room where Dean is about to perform the surgery replacing Jim's body with Chris'. Chris impales Dean with the antlers of a deer mount, knocking over a candle which sets fire to the operating room with an anesthetized Jim inside. Missy attacks Chris in the kitchen but he stabs and kills her, and is then attacked again by Jeremy as he heads towards the door; he overpowers and kills Jeremy before leaving in the latter's car. On the way out, he hits Georgina—who is revealed to be possessed by Rose's grandmother, Marianne—and knocks her unconscious. Compelled by guilt from his mother's death, he decides to carry her into the car, but she awakens and attacks him. In the ensuing struggle, the car crashes and Georgina is killed.

An armed Rose apprehends Chris with Walter, who is possessed by Roman. Chris uses the flash on his phone to neutralize Roman, allowing Walter to regain control of his body. Walter takes Rose's rifle and shoots her in the stomach before shooting himself. Chris begins to strangle Rose, but he finds himself unable to kill her. Police sirens approach, and Rose cries out for help. However, the driver is revealed to be Rod, who drives away with Chris as Rose is left bleeding out on the road.

Cast 
 Daniel Kaluuya as Chris Washington, a young black photographer who is invited by Rose to her family's house
 Zailand Adams as 11-year-old Chris
 Allison Williams as Rose Armitage, the daughter of the Armitage family and Chris Washington's girlfriend
 Bradley Whitford as Dean Armitage, a neurosurgeon and Rose's father
 Caleb Landry Jones as Jeremy Armitage, Rose's brother
 Stephen Root as Jim Hudson, a blind art dealer who is a member of the wealthy Order of the Coagula organization
 LaKeith Stanfield as Andre Hayworth / Logan King, the latter a member of the Order of the Coagula who has taken over the body of Andre, the person who had gone missing 6 months prior to the film's events
 Catherine Keener as Missy Armitage, a psychiatrist and Rose's mother
 Lil Rel Howery as Rod Williams, a TSA Airport police officer and Chris' best friend
 Keegan-Michael Key as NCAA Prospect, a victim presumed to be the Coagula's next target 
 Erika Alexander as Detective Latoya
 Betty Gabriel as Georgina, a black housekeeper who is actually Marianne Armitage, the Armitage family matriarch and Rose's grandmother, in Georgina's body
 Marcus Henderson as Walter, the Armitage's black groundskeeper, who is actually Roman Armitage in Walter's body
 Richard Herd as Roman Armitage (before having taken over Walter's body), founder of the Order of the Coagula and the patriarch of the Armitage family, also the grandfather of Rose
 Jeronimo Spinx as Detective Drake 
 Ian Casselberry as Detective Garcia
 Trey Burvant as Officer Ryan

Writer-director Jordan Peele voices the sounds made by the wounded deer, and narrates a UNCF commercial.

Production

Development 

Get Out is the directorial debut of Jordan Peele, who had previously worked in comedy, including the sketch show Key & Peele. He felt the horror and comedy genres are similar in that "so much of it is pacing, so much of it [hinges on] reveals", and that comedy gave him "something of a training" for the film. The Stepford Wives (1975) provided inspiration, about which Peele said, "it's a horror movie but has a satirical premise." As the film deals with racism, Peele has stated that the story is "very personal", although he noted that "it quickly veers off from anything autobiographical."

Peele was introduced to producer Sean McKittrick by comedy partner Keegan-Michael Key in 2013. "I was shooting a movie with Keegan-Michael Key. He said, 'You gotta meet Jordan, he's a horror fanatic and he has all these ideas.' Jordan and I met for coffee in New Orleans. He said, 'Here's one you'll never want to make,' and he pitched me the whole story. I'd never seen that movie before. It fascinated me. So I said right at the table, 'Okay, I'm going to buy this pitch and pay you to write it.' I think he was a little shocked." Peele wrote the first draft of the script in two months.

Casting 

The lead actors, Daniel Kaluuya and Allison Williams, were cast in November 2015, with other roles cast between December 2015 and February 2016. Kaluuya was cast based on the strength of his performance in Black Mirror episode "Fifteen Million Merits". "That party sequence is why I really wanted to do this film, because I've been to that party," Kaluuya told the Los Angeles Times. "He [Chris] feels like an everyman. He's kind of like J. Cole. Chris is that guy that everyone knows, who has been in everyone's class at school. That good guy from around the area." Tiffany Haddish was asked to audition for a role in the film but declined.

Williams said she was cast by Peele as a sneaky gambit to disorient audiences. "Jordan told me that he had always pictured me as Rose because Peter Pan or Marnie would make it easier for people to trust me," Williams noted. "I was looking for a role that would weaponize everything that people take for granted about me. So I instantly signed on to it." Williams later observed that white audiences frequently misinterpret the motivations of her character Rose by defending her as being a victim of the cult, an interpretation she rejects, as the character is simply evil. The scene where Rose drinks milk while looking at potential future victims was conceived shortly before shooting to add an additional creepy element to the character. The song used in the scene, "(I've Had) The Time of My Life", is intended to reflect Rose's emotional detachment. "There's something kind of horrific about milk," Peele explained. "Think about it! Think about what we're doing. Milk is kind of gross."

Filming 
Principal photography began on February 16, 2016. Shooting took place in Fairhope, Alabama, for three weeks, followed by Barton Academy and in the Ashland Place Historic District in midtown Mobile, Alabama. The exterior and interior of the house was filmed just south of Fairhope. Principal photography lasted 23 days. Although this movie was filmed in Alabama, Jordan Peele has stressed that the story is not supposed to be understood as taking place in Alabama or anywhere in the South. During a February 2017 interview with Bethonie Butler in the Washington Post, Peele said "he deliberately avoided setting the movie in red state territory. 'It was really important for me to not have the villains in this film reflect the typical red state type who is usually categorized as being racist. It felt like that was too easy,' he said. 'I wanted this film to explore the false sense of security one can have with the, sort of, New York liberal type.'" According to a February 2017 Geoff Herbert article in the Syracuse (NY) Post-Standard, the movie is set in Upstate New York.

Peele described conceptualizing the "sunken place" as an impassioned journey in an interview with Vanity Fair. "I always had this concept of the place that you're falling toward when you're going to sleep, and you get that falling sensation and catch yourself. And if you didn't catch yourself, where would you end up? I had this hellish image, and I thought of this idea of, 'What if you were in a place, and you could look through your own eyes as if they were literal windows or a screen, and see what your body was seeing, but feel like a prisoner in your own mind—the chamber of your mind?'" Peele explained. "The moment I thought of that, it immediately occurred to me the theme of abduction and connection to the prison industrial complex that this movie was sort of presenting a metaphor for. It was a very emotional discovery. I remember having so much fun writing it, but at that moment when I figured out this weird, esoteric, but also an emotionally brutal form of suffering to put the character through—I literally cried writing the scene."

Lil Rel Howery says the allegorical symbolism in the film is strongly entrenched in the fear historically experienced by African Americans. "It goes back to the way I grew up; I'm just being honest," Howery explained. "Segregation created this. Stories about people like Emmett Till. It's history; crazy things have happened, so people are going to embellish and pass that onto their kids as a warning. Jordan was so smart to hit on all these stories that could be considered myths, but a lot of it is rooted in truth."

Peele was worried about the film's chances of success, telling the Los Angeles Times, "What if white people don't want to come to see the movie because they're afraid of being villainized with black people in the crowd? What if black people don't want to see the movie because they don't want to sit next to a white person while a black person is being victimized on-screen?"

Alternative endings 
In the original ending, Chris is arrested by the police after strangling Rose. Instead of rescuing Chris, Rod meets him in jail and asks him for information about the Armitage family to investigate, but Chris insists that he stopped them and everything is fine. Peele intended this ending to reflect the realities of racism. By the time production had begun, however, several high-profile police shootings of black people had made discussion, in Peele's words, "more woke". After gauging reception at test screenings, he decided the film needed a happy ending, but felt a moment when the audience believes Chris is about to be arrested would preserve the intended reaction.

Peele considered several other endings, some of which are included on the DVD and Blu-ray release. In one ending, Rod breaks into the estate, finds Chris, and calls his name, but Chris responds, "I assure you, I don't know who you're talking about."

Music 
Michael Abels composed the film's score, which Peele wanted to have "distinctly black voices and black musical references." This proved to be a challenge, as Peele found that African-American music typically has what he termed "at the very least, a glimmer of hope to it." At the same time, Peele also wanted to avoid having a voodoo motif. The final score features Swahili voices as well as a blues influence. "Sikiliza Kwa Wahenga" is a Swahili phrase that translates to "listen to (your) ancestors," which indicates to the listener, "something bad is coming. Run."

"The words are issuing a warning to Chris," Peele said. "The whole idea of the movie is 'Get out!'—it's what we're screaming at the character on-screen." The song "Redbone" by Childish Gambino appears at the movie's beginning. Other songs in the film include "Run Rabbit Run" by Flanagan and Allen and "(I've Had) The Time of My Life" by Bill Medley and Jennifer Warnes.

The soundtrack was released on vinyl for the first time in 2018 by Waxwork Records and included an exclusive essay by Peele.

Themes 
Lanre Bakare in The Guardian wrote: "The villains here aren't southern rednecks or neo-Nazi skinheads, or the so-called 'alt-right'. They're middle-class white liberals. The kind of people who read this website. The kind of people who shop at Trader Joe's, donate to the ACLU and would have voted for Obama a third time if they could. The thing Get Out does so well—and the thing that will rankle with some viewers—is to show how, however unintentionally, these same people can make life so hard and uncomfortable for black people. It exposes a liberal ignorance and hubris that has been allowed to fester. It's an attitude, an arrogance which in the film leads to a horrific final solution, but in reality leads to a complacency that is just as dangerous."

Peele said about the film, "The real thing at hand here is slavery ... It's some dark shit." Peele stated that the character of Hudson, who "is the farthest from racist" due to his blindness, "still plays a part in the system of racism. And the way it manifests in that movie is, yeah, a guy who believes that the eye of this better artist, this black artist, is what's separating him from being a success or a failure. Which also, to me, is a commentary on a sentiment I was hearing a lot during the Obama era, this whole mythology of a [purported] advantage of being black in this culture."

The film also depicts the lack of attention on missing black Americans compared to missing white girls and women. Slates Damon Young stated the film's premise was "depressingly plausible ... Although black people only comprise 13 percent of America's population, they are 34 percent of America's missing, a reality that exists as the result of a mélange of racial and socioeconomic factors rendering black lives demonstratively less valuable than the lives [of] our white counterparts."

Chris' perceived superiority is one of the reasons why the white characters in the movie are so fixated on him. Get Out shows how the white characters' interest in black bodies is more closely related to jealousy and covetousness than it is to condescension, in contrast to racism's typical definition as the perception of another race as inferior. Dean explains to Chris that Jesse Owens, a black runner, defeated his father in the 1936 Olympic qualifying rounds. Throughout the dinner, numerous people compliment Chris on various characteristics, from his body to his artistic talent as a photographer. As it turns out, the Armitages' method entails inserting a white brain into a black body to transfer the black person's talent to the awareness of the white person. Because he wants to view and capture images with Chris' expertise, Jim Hudson wants to get his brain implanted into Chris' skull.

Peele wrote Rose as a subversion of the white savior trope, and in particular, of films where most white characters are evil, but one is good. Peele and Williams stated that Rose behaved like a teenager as her emotional development was delayed. Williams believed that Rose was not a victim of indoctrination, hypnotism or Stockholm syndrome, but simply evil. After Rose's intentions are revealed, her previous "soft and welcoming" appearance becomes a "vision of cold, meticulous elitism", with hunting jodhpurs, a white dress shirt, and a "sleek ponytail"; she hangs photographs of her ex-partners on her wall like hunting trophies.

Reception

Box office 
Get Out grossed $176 million in the United States and Canada and $79.4 million in other territories for a worldwide gross of $255.5 million, against a production budget of $4.5 million. Deadline Hollywood calculated the net profit of the film to be $124.8 million, when factoring together all expenses and revenues, making it the 10th most profitable release of 2017. Vulture described Get Outs 5.3 multiple as "staggering".

In North America, Get Out was released on February 24, 2017, alongside Collide and Rock Dog, and was expected to gross $20–25 million from 2,773 theaters in its opening weekend. The film made $1.8 million from Thursday night previews and $10.8 million on its first day. It went on to open for $33.4 million, finishing first at the box office. 38% of the film's opening-weekend audience was African American, while 35% was white, with Georgia being its most profitable market. 90% of its opening weekend ticket sales were purchased at the theater (versus in advance). In its second weekend, the film finished in second at the box office behind new release Logan ($88.4 million), grossing $28.3 million, for a drop of 15.4%. Horror films tend to drop at least 60% in their second weekend, so this was above average. In its third weekend, the film grossed $21.1 million, dropping just 25% from its previous week, and finished third at the box office behind newcomer Kong: Skull Island and Logan.

In March 2017, three weeks after its release, Get Out crossed the $100 million mark domestically, making Peele the first black writer-director to do so with his debut movie. On April 8, 2017, the film became the highest-grossing film domestically directed by a black filmmaker, beating out F. Gary Gray's Straight Outta Compton, which grossed $162.8 million domestically in 2015. Gray reclaimed the record two weeks later when The Fate of the Furious grossed $173.3 million on its fourteenth day of release on April 27. Domestically, Get Out is also the highest-grossing debut film based on an original screenplay in Hollywood history, beating the two-decade-long record of 1999's The Blair Witch Project ($140.5 million). By the end of March, Los Angeles Times had declared the film's success a "cultural phenomenon" noting that in addition to its box office success, "moviegoers have shared countless 'sunken place' Internet memes and other Get Out-inspired fan art across social media." Josh Rottenberg, the editor of the piece, attributed the film's success to the fact that it was released "at one of the most politically charged moments in memory."

Critical response 

On review aggregation website Rotten Tomatoes, the film has an approval rating of 98% based on 400 reviews, and an average rating of 8.30/10. The website's critical consensus reads, "Funny, scary, and thought-provoking, Get Out seamlessly weaves its trenchant social critiques into a brilliantly effective and entertaining horror/comedy thrill ride." The film was the highest rated wide release of 2017 on the site. On Metacritic, the film has an average weighted score of 85 out of 100, based on 48 critics, indicating "universal acclaim". Audiences polled by CinemaScore gave the film an average grade of "A−" on an A+ to F scale, while PostTrak reported filmgoers gave an 84% overall positive score and a 66% "definite recommend".

Richard Roeper gave the film  stars, saying: "the real star of the film is writer-director Jordan Peele, who has created a work that addresses the myriad levels of racism, pays homage to some great horror films, carves out its own creative path, has a distinctive visual style—and is flat-out funny as well." Keith Phipps of Uproxx praised the cast and Peele's direction, saying, "That he brings the technical skill of a practiced horror master is more of a surprise. The final thrill of Get Out—beyond the slow-building sense of danger, the unsettling atmosphere, and the twisty revelation of what's really going on—is that Peele's just getting started." Mike Rougeau of IGN gave the film 9/10, and wrote, "Get Outs whole journey, through every tense conversation, A-plus punchline and shocking act of violence, feels totally earned. And the conclusion is worth each uncomfortable chuckle and moment of doubt." Peter Travers of Rolling Stone gave Get Out a 3.5 out of 4, and called it a "jolt-a-minute horrorshow laced with racial tension and stinging satirical wit." Scott Mendelson of Forbes said the film captured the zeitgeist and called it a "modern American horror classic".

Critic Armond White gave a negative review in National Review, referring to the film as a "Get-Whitey movie" and stating that it "[reduces] racial politics to trite horror-comedy ... it's an Obama movie for Tarantino fans." The New York Observer critic Rex Reed included the film on his list of 10 Worst Films of 2017, and later sardonically stated in a CBS Sunday Morning interview, "I didn't care if all the black men are turned into robots." A writer on Sunday Mornings website noted that there are no robots in the film.

In 2018, IndieWire writers ranked the script the third best American screenplay of the 21st century, with Chris O'Falt arguing that Peele "walked a narrative tightrope that required as much craft as insight [...] the audience's understanding of what Chris (Daniel Kaluuya) is thinking and feeling is always clear. Hitchcock-like in its execution, and playing off genre and audience expectation (especially about how racial dynamics are traditionally portrayed on screen), the twists and turns of "Get Out" are not only gasp-inducing; each one reveals a new layer to its exploration of systematic racist belief systems."

Accolades 

At the 90th Academy Awards, the film earned four nominations: Best Picture, Best Director, Best Original Screenplay, and Best Actor for Daniel Kaluuya. Peele became the third person (after Warren Beatty and James L. Brooks) to earn Best Picture, Director and Screenplay nominations for a debut film, and the first African-American winner for Best Original Screenplay (and fourth overall nominated, after John Singleton, Spike Lee, and Suzanne de Passe). Get Out divided Oscar voters, with many older members of the Academy of Motion Picture Arts and Sciences dismissing it or choosing not to see it. According to Vulture, new voting members said they ran into "interference" from more senior members when it came to evaluating the film as Best Picture. "I had multiple conversations with longtime Academy members who were like, 'That was not an Oscar film,'" according to a new voter. "Honestly, a few of them had not even seen it and they were saying it, so dispelling that kind of thing has been super important." One anonymous Oscar voter told The Hollywood Reporter they felt alienated by the Oscar campaign: "Instead of focusing on the fact that this was an entertaining little horror movie that made quite a bit of money, they started trying to suggest it had deeper meaning than it does, and, as far as I'm concerned, they played the race card, and that really turned me off. In fact, at one of the luncheons, the lead actor [Kaluuya], who is not from the United States, was giving us a lecture on racism in America and how black lives matter, and I thought, 'What does this have to do with Get Out? They're trying to make me think that if I don't vote for this movie, I'm a racist.' I was really offended."

At the 75th Golden Globe Awards, Get Out received two nominations: Best Motion Picture – Musical or Comedy and Best Actor – Comedy or Musical for Daniel Kaluuya. The submission in the comedy category prompted debate about the premise of the film. Although advertised as a "satirical horror film," Universal Pictures submitted it as a comedy because of less competition in the category, which gave the film a greater chance of receiving accolades. Peele joked in a tweet, "'Get Out' is a documentary," but it was reported he approved of the submission.

The film also received nominations at the 24th Screen Actors Guild Awards, 49th NAACP Image Awards, and 23rd Critics' Choice Awards, among others. It won Best Foreign International Film at the British Independent Film Awards. At the 33rd Independent Spirit Awards on March 3, 2018, Jordan Peele won the Best Director Award and the film won Best Picture.  In 2021, the Writers Guild of America ranked the screenplay the greatest of the 21st century so far.

See also 

 Race in horror films
 List of directorial debuts
 List of racism-related films
 List of black films of the 2010s

References

Further reading

External links 

 
 
 
 
 
 
 

2010s psychological horror films
2010s satirical films
2017 directorial debut films
2017 films
2017 horror films
2017 horror thriller films
African-American horror films
African-American films
American action thriller films
American action horror films
American body horror films
American horror thriller films
American independent films
2017 independent films
American psychological horror films
American satirical films
Blumhouse Productions films
Films about brain transplants
2010s English-language films
Films about hypnosis
Films about couples
Films about families
Films about interracial romance
Films about photographers
Films about racism in the United States
Films directed by Jordan Peele
Films produced by Jason Blum
Films produced by Jordan Peele
Films scored by Michael Abels
Films set in New York (state)
Films shot in Alabama
Films whose writer won the Best Original Screenplay Academy Award
Films with screenplays by Jordan Peele
Independent Spirit Award for Best Film winners
Universal Pictures films
Mad scientist films
Films about the upper class
2010s American films